The men's hammer throw was an event at the 1984 Summer Olympics in Los Angeles, California. There were 23 participating athletes from 13 nations. The maximum number of athletes per nation had been set at 3 since the 1930 Olympic Congress. The eight highest-ranked competitors after three rounds qualified for the final three throws to decide the medals. The qualification mark was set at 72.00 metres. 

The event was won by Juha Tiainen of Finland, the nation's first medal in the event. It was "one of the most devalued Olympic competitions ever" due to the absence of the Soviet team, which had swept the medals the last two Games and had both Yuriy Sedykh (the two-time defending champion, two-time European champion, and world record) and Sergey Litvinov (1980 silver medalist and 1983 world champion over runner-up Sedykh) as two of the top throwers in the world. It was the first time since 1948 that the Olympic record was not broken. Karl-Hans Riehm of West Germany, a contender in the event and finalist in both 1972 and 1976 before being kept out of the 1980 Games due to the American-led boycott, finally earned a medal with his silver-winning performance. His compatriot Klaus Ploghaus took bronze. They were the first two medals for West Germany as a separate nation, though Germany and the United Team of Germany had each taken medals previously.

Background

This was the 19th appearance of the event, which has been held at every Summer Olympics except 1896. Three of the 12 finalists from the 1980 Games returned: seventh-place finisher Giampaolo Urlando of Italy (the top-placed athlete from 1980 not from a boycotting nation), ninth-place finisher Harri Huhtala of Finland, and tenth-place finisher Juha Tiainen of Finland. The Soviet-led boycott kept out the best throwers in the world, with Litvinov and Sedykh absent. Riehm and Tiainen were the favorites among the depleted field.

Algeria and Mauritius each made their debut in the event. The United States appeared for the 18th time, most of any nation, having missed only the boycotted 1980 Games.

Competition format

The competition used the two-round format introduced in 1936, with the qualifying round completely separate from the divided final. In qualifying, each athlete received three attempts; those recording a mark of at least 72.00 metres advanced to the final. If fewer than 12 athletes achieved that distance, the top 12 would advance. The results of the qualifying round were then ignored. Finalists received three throws each, with the top eight competitors receiving an additional three attempts. The best distance among those six throws counted.

Records

Prior to the competition, the existing world and Olympic records were as follows.

No new world or Olympic records were set during the competition.

Schedule

All times are Pacific Daylight Time (UTC-7)

Results

Qualifying

Final

Giampaolo Urlando finished fourth at 75.96 metres but the Italian athlete was subsequently disqualified as his doping tests proved positive.

See also
1982 Men's European Championships Hammer Throw (Athens)
1983 Men's World Championship Hammer Throw (Helsinki)
1984 Men's Friendship Games Hammer Throw (Moscow)
1984 Hammer Throw Year Ranking
1986 Men's European Championships Hammer Throw (Stuttgart)
1987 Men's World Championship Hammer Throw (Rome)

References

External links
  Official Report
  Results
  olympic.neostrada
  hammerthrow.wz

H
Hammer throw at the Olympics
Men's events at the 1984 Summer Olympics